Ochthocharis is a genus of flowering plants belonging to the family Melastomataceae.

Its native range is Western Tropical Africa to Zambia, Indo-China to New Guinea.

Species:

Ochthocharis bornensis 
Ochthocharis bullata 
Ochthocharis decumbens 
Ochthocharis dicellandroides 
Ochthocharis javanica 
Ochthocharis megalophylla 
Ochthocharis ovata 
Ochthocharis paniculata 
Ochthocharis setosa

References

Melastomataceae
Melastomataceae genera